Joe Creek is a stream in the U.S. state of South Dakota.

The creek was named for Joe Arnold, an Indian who often sold firewood to the local riverboat traffic.

See also
List of rivers of South Dakota

References

Rivers of Hughes County, South Dakota
Rivers of South Dakota